City of Terrors is a 1978 role-playing game adventure for Tunnels & Trolls published by Flying Buffalo.

Plot summary
City of Terrors is an adventure where the player characters go to the island of Phoron which houses the City of Terrors.

Reception
Tom Gordon reviewed City of Terrors in The Space Gamer No. 33. Gordon commented that "The entire booklet (except for the cover) is printed on slick glossy paper. The artwork is fantastic. A 'reincarnation clause' helps eliminate the 'instant death' situations. It is extremely well balanced and worth the money. City of Terrors is by far the best solitaire game Flying Buffalo has produced yet."

References

Role-playing game supplements introduced in 1978
Tunnels & Trolls adventures